Dionysus is the ninth studio album by the British-Australian band Dead Can Dance, officially released on 2 November 2018 by PIAS Recordings, six years after the group's last album, Anastasis.

Artwork and title 
The album cover's artwork features a skull mask made by the Huichol of Mexico. Dionysus is the ancient Greek god of wine and religious ecstasy.

Critical reception
Dionysus was met with "generally favorable" reviews from critics. At Metacritic, which assigns a weighted average rating out of 100 to reviews from mainstream publications, this release received an average score of 78, based on 10 reviews. Aggregator Album of the Year gave the release a 79 out of 100 based on a critical consensus of 15 reviews.

Track listing 

All physical versions are indexed as just two tracks respectively.

Personnel 
Dead Can Dance
 Brendan Perry – vocals, instrumentation, cover photography and design
 Lisa Gerrard – vocals, instrumentation, 
Additional personnel
 Geoff Pesche – mastering
 DLT – layout

Charts

References

External links 

  at the band's official website

2018 albums
Dead Can Dance albums
PIAS Recordings albums